Aram Grigoryan may refer to:
 Aram Grigoryan (politician)
 Aram Grigoryan (judoka)